Infanta Elena, Duchess of Lugo (Elena María Isabel Dominica de Silos de Borbón y de Grecia; born 20 December 1963) is the first child and eldest daughter of Juan Carlos I (King of Spain from 1975 to 2014) and Queen Sofía of Spain, and third in the line of succession to the Spanish throne. She has a younger sister, Cristina, and a younger brother, King Felipe VI.

Elena has represented her family abroad on several occasions, having travelled to Germany, the United Kingdom, the United States, Argentina, Japan, Peru, and the Philippines.

Early life and family

Infanta Elena was born on 20 December 1963 at Our Lady of Loreto Hospital, now known as ORPEA Madrid Loreto, in Madrid. She is the first member to be born in hospital from King Juan Carlos I's family and she is eldest child of King Juan Carlos I, the former Spanish monarch, and his wife, Queen Sofía (the former Princess of Greece and Denmark), She has one sister and one brother. In 1987, Infanta Elena met her future husband while she was studying French literature in Paris.

Marriage
Elena married Jaime de Marichalar y Sáenz de Tejada, Lord of Tejada, son of Amalio de Marichalar y Bruguera, Count of Ripalda and his wife María de la Concepción Sáenz de Tejada y Fernández de Bobadilla, Lady of Tejada, on 18 March 1995, in Seville Cathedral, Seville, at which time her father conferred on her the title Duchess of Lugo for life. The couple have two children: Felipe (born 17 July 1998) and Victoria (born 9 September 2000) were born at Ruber International Hospital in Madrid .

On 13 November 2007, it was announced that Elena had separated from her husband. In November 2009, the Spanish media reported that she and her husband would divorce, although a rumour to that effect had been circulating for a year before the announcement was made. Their divorce papers were signed on 25 November 2009. The Duchess and Duke of Lugo were divorced in December 2009. On 21 January 2010, the divorce was registered at the Civil Registry of the Spanish Royal Family. It was officially announced on 9 February 2010, that Jaime de Marichalar was no longer permitted to use the ducal title and that he was no longer considered to be an official member of the Spanish Royal Family.

Titles, styles, honours and arms

Titles and styles
20 December 1963  3 March 1995: Her Royal Highness Infanta Doña Elena of Spain
3 March 1995present: Her Royal Highness Infanta Doña Elena of Spain, Duchess of Lugo

Honours

National honours
: 
 Dame Grand Cross of the Order of Charles III
 Dame Grand Cross of the Order of Isabella the Catholic
 Dame of the Royal Cavalry Armory of Seville
 Dame of the Royal Cavalry Armory of Zaragoza

Foreign honours
: Grand Star of the Decoration of Honour for Services to the Republic of Austria
: Grand Cordon of the Order of Leopold I
: Grand Cross of the Order of Merit
: Grand Cross of the Order of Honour
: Grand Cross of the Order of the Quetzal
: Grand Cross of the Order of the Falcon
: Knight Grand Cross of the Order of Merit of the Italian Republic
: Grand Cordon (Paulownia) of the Order of the Precious Crown
: Grand Cordon of the Order of the Star of Jordan
: Grand Cross of the Order of Adolphe of Nassau
: Member 1st Class of the Order of the Three Divine Powers
: Knight Grand Cross of the Order of Orange-Nassau
: Grand Cross of the Order of Saint Olav
: Grand Cross of the Order of the Sun of Peru
: Grand Cross of the Order of Christ
: Grand Cross of the Order of Prince Henry
: Recipient of the 50th Birthday Badge Medal of King Carl XVI Gustaf

Ancestry

See also
Line of succession to the Spanish Throne

References

External links 
Her Royal Highness the Infanta Elena (official profile) 
 

1963 births
Living people
Spanish infantas
Daughters of kings
House of Bourbon (Spain)
Dukes of Lugo
Alumni of the University of Exeter

Knights Grand Cross of the Order of Isabella the Catholic

Grand Cordons of the Order of the Precious Crown
Grand Crosses of the Order of Christ (Portugal)
Grand Crosses of the Order of Honour (Greece)
Grand Crosses of the Order of Prince Henry
Grand Crosses of the Order of the Quetzal
Knights Grand Cross of the Order of the Falcon
Knights Grand Cross of the Order of Merit of the Italian Republic
Knights Grand Cross of the Order of Orange-Nassau
Members of the Order of Tri Shakti Patta, First Class
Grand Crosses of the Order of the Sun of Peru
Spanish duchesses
Spanish people of Greek descent